Calacanthia is a genus of shore bugs in the family Saldidae. There are about seven described species in Calacanthia.

Species
These seven species belong to the genus Calacanthia:
 Calacanthia alpicola (Salhberg, 1880)
 Calacanthia angulosa (Kiritshenko, 1912)
 Calacanthia grandis Cobben, 1985
 Calacanthia josifovi Vinokurov, 2008
 Calacanthia sichuanicus Chen & Zheng, 1987
 Calacanthia tibetana Drake, 1954
 Calacanthia trybomi (Sahlberg, 1878)

References

Further reading

 
 

Articles created by Qbugbot
Heteroptera genera
Saldoidini